Federation of Malaya competed in the 1958 British Empire and Commonwealth Games held in Cardiff, Wales from 18 to 26 July 1958.

Medal summary

Medals by sport

Medallists

Athletics

Men
Track event

Key
Note–Ranks given for track events are within the athlete's heat only
Q = Qualified for the next round
q = Qualified for the next round as a fastest loser or, in field events, by position without achieving the qualifying target
NR = National record
N/A = Round not applicable for the event
Bye = Athlete not required to compete in round

Weightlifting

Men

References

Nations at the 1958 British Empire and Commonwealth Games
1958 in Malayan sport
Malaysia at the Commonwealth Games